The 461st Bombardment Squadron is an inactive United States Air Force unit.  Its last assignment was with 346th Bombardment Group at Kadena Airfield, Okinawa, where it was inactivated on 30 June 1946.  From 1942 the squadron served as a replacement training unit for heavy bomber aircrews.  It was inactivated in the spring of 1944 in a general reorganization of Army Air Forces training units.  The squadron was activated again in 1944 as a Boeing B-29 Superfortress unit.  Although it deployed to the Pacific, it arrived too late to see combat service.

History

Heavy bomber replacement training
The 461st Bombardment Squadron was first activated in July 1942 at Salt Lake City Army Air Base, Utah as one of the original squadrons of the 331st Bombardment Group.  In September it moved to Casper Army Air Field, where it conducted Boeing B-17 Flying Fortress replacement training until 1943, when it converted to the Consolidated B-24 Liberator.  Replacement training units were oversized units which trained aircrews prior to their deployment to combat theaters.  However, the Army Air Forces found that standard military units, based on relatively inflexible tables of organization, were not proving to be well adapted to the training mission.  Accordingly, it adopted a more functional system in which each base was organized into a separate numbered unit, while the groups and squadrons acting as replacement training units were disbanded or inactivated.  This resulted in the 462d, along with other units at Casper, being inactivated in the spring of 1944 and being replaced by the 211th AAF Base Unit (Combat Crew Training Station, Heavy), which assumed the 331st Group's mission, personnel, and equipment.

Very heavy bomber operations
In August 1944, the squadron was reactivated as a Boeing B-29 Superfortress unit at Dalhart Army Air Field, Texas and assigned to the 346th Bombardment Group.  It trained with Superfortresses at Dalhart and Pratt Army Air Field, Kansas until June 1945, when it began moving to Okinawa to become part of Eighth Air Force.  Although the war ended before the squadron could begin operations, a few of its crews formed part of its forward echelon and flew missions with B-29 units of Twentieth Air Force.

The squadron flew several show of force missions from Okinawa over Japan following VJ Day.  It also evacuated prisoners of war from camps in Japan to the Philippines.  The squadron was inactivated on Okinawa in June 1946.

Lineage
 Constituted as the 461st Bombardment Squadron (Heavy) on 1 July 1942
 Activated on 6 July 1942
 Inactivated on 1 April 1944
 Redesignated 461st Bombardment Squadron, Very Heavy on 4 August 1944
 Activated on 18 August 1944
 Inactivated on 30 June 1946

Assignments
 331st Bombardment Group, 6 July 1942 - 1 April 1944
 346th Bombardment Group, 18 August 1944 - 30 June 1946

Stations
 Salt Lake City Army Air Base, Utah,  6 July 1942
 Casper Army Air Field, Wyoming, 15 September 1942 - 1 April 1944
 Dalhart Army Air Field, Texas, 18 August 1944
 Pratt Army Air Field, Kansas, 12 December 1944 - 29 June 1945
 Kadena Airfield, Okinawa, 13 August 1945 - 30 June 1946

Aircraft

 Boeing B-17 Flying Fortress, 1942-1943, 1945
 Consolidated B-24 Liberator, 1943-1944
 Boeing B-29 Superfortress, 1945-1946
 Curtiss C-46 Commando, 1946

References

 Notes

Bibliography

 
 
 
 

Military units and formations established in 1942
Bombardment squadrons of the United States Army Air Forces